Punggok Rindukan Bulan (English title: This Longing) is a 2008 Malaysian film in the Malay language. It was directed by Azharr Rudin and produced by Da Huang Pictures. It premiered at the 2008 Pusan International Film Festival. It was shot entirely in the southern city of Johor Bahru, mostly at the low-cost Bukit Chagar flats that have since been demolished to make way for development. The film also screened in several other film festivals such as the 2008 Vancouver International Film Festival, the  2008 Jakarta International Film Festival and 2009  BAFICI It screened in limited release in Malaysia through Golden Screen Cinemas International Screens from 25 September 2008.

Unusually for a Malaysian film Punggok Rindukan Bulan contains no music or songs.

The film was produced with the aid of grants from Multimedia Development Corporation and Krishen Jit Astro fund.

Synopsis 
A film about a boy, barely in secondary school, Sidi and his father Adman, who both unknowingly cope with the sudden absence of a key female figure in their life. In a probable separate story, a boyish young woman returns to photograph the backdrop of her past. Set in the border town of Johor Bahru, Malaysia. The literal meaning of the title is a Malay saying like "the owl misses the moon" a reflection of unrequited (and unconsummated) longing.

Production information

Cast

Saeful Nazhif Satria ... Sidi
Sahronizam Noor ... Adman
Maya Karin ... Umi
Salehuddin Abu Bakar ... Lelaki Kurang Kemas
Sharifah Amani ... Riza

Crew

Azharr Rudin ... Writer/Director/Editor
Amir Muhammad ... Producer
Tan Chui Mui ... Executive Producer
Sidi Saleh ... Director of Photography
Hairul Askor Salleh ... Assistant Director/ Production Manager

References

External links 
 Punggok Rindukan Bulan at the Internet Movie Database.
 Punggok Rindukan Bulan at Da Huang Pictures.

2008 films
Malay-language films
Malaysian independent films
2008 independent films
Da Huang Pictures films